Kalubhaiji Chanabhaiji Rathod is an Indian politician, social worker and serving Member of the Gujarat Legislative Assembly as a member of Bhartiya Janata Party and representing the Una constituency in Junagadh district of Gujarat.

References 

Gujarat MLAs 2022–2027
1963 births
Living people
Gujarat MLAs 2007–2012
People from Gir Somnath district
Bharatiya Janata Party politicians from Gujarat